The Big To-Do is the eighth studio album by American rock band Drive-By Truckers, released on March 16, 2010. It is their first album released on ATO Records, which they signed to after completing their four album deal with New West Records.

Background

The Big To-Do marks the seventh Drive-By Truckers album produced by David Barbe.  The addition of keyboardist Jay Gonzalez to the band's line-up (though he played on the band's second live album) further differentiates this album from its predecessors, and showcases the influence Tom Petty and the Heartbreakers (specifically Benmont Tench) have had on the band.

The Big To-Do was recorded over three blocks of sessions in 2009 (ten days in January, five days in March, and ten days in May) resulting in 25 songs.  The band decided to split these tracks between The Big To-Do and its follow-up Go-Go Boots.  The album had been mixed, mastered, and completely done before Cooley wrote "Birthday Boy," which was quickly recorded, mixed, and inserted into The Big To-Do.

Bandmember Patterson Hood said that The Big To-Do is "very much a rock album. Very melodic and more rocking than anything since disc 2 of Southern Rock Opera."  Hood also states in the album's liner notes that The Big To-Do was not written or recorded with a specific concept in mind (unlike many of the band's earlier albums).  The recurring images of the circus, Hood explains, are analogous to "rock shows."  While most of the Drive-By Trucker's albums have chronicled the Southern past, The Big To-Do is written entirely about the present.  Hood and Cooley's respective songs "This Fucking Job" and "Get Downtown," describe from different points of view the current floundering economy (and are argued by Grant Alden to be the band's most political songs since "The Living Bubba").

Guitarist Mike Cooley commented on the development of the album, explaining that because he didn't have many songs to contribute when the band started working on the album, he decided to focus on "being a player on everybody else's songs while still trying to come up with my own thing."  Cooley's hook of a riff in "That Wig He Made Her Wear" exemplifies this statement.  He continued by saying that, for him, the turning points in creating the album were working on the songs "You Got Another" and "The Flying Wallendas."

Track listing

Personnel
Patterson Hood – guitar, vocals
Mike Cooley – guitar, vocals
Brad Morgan – drums
Shonna Tucker – bass, vocals
John Neff – guitar, pedal steel
Jay Gonzalez – keyboards, backing vocals
David Barbe – guitar, keyboards

Charts

References

External links
Drive-By Truckers Website
A Valentine's Day To-Do
The Big To-Do Commentary

Drive-By Truckers albums
2010 albums
ATO Records albums
Alternative country albums by American artists